The 1962 Oakland Raiders season was their third season in Oakland and in the American Football League, and their first at Frank Youell Field in Oakland, their home for four seasons. 

Attempting to improve on their 2–12 record from the previous season, the Raiders lost their first thirteen games and finally won in the season finale, a 20–0 shutout of the visiting Boston Patriots, a team with nine wins. The victory in the rain and mud snapped their nineteen-game losing streak.

Oakland's  winning percentage remains the lowest in the ten-season history of the AFL. The Raiders did not return to the bottom of their division for over three decades, when they were an NFL team in the AFC West division in 1995, the prologue of their second and last stint in Oakland.

Season schedule

Game summaries

Week 14

Standings

Draft picks

References

Oakland
Oakland Raiders seasons
Oakland